Monash Tech School is one of ten Tech Schools funded by the Victorian State Government. Its name is linked to STEM education and references 'Technology' rather than 'Technical' training. It is hosted by Monash University and administrated by John Monash Science School. Monash Tech School is located at Monash University in Clayton.

The Tech School is a shared learning centre that provides real-world experiences to secondary students from partner government schools to amplify their achievement and engagement in STEM. With currently three-quarters of occupations require sciences, technology, engineering and mathematics (STEM) skills. Their programs bring together design thinking, prototyping skills and product delivery that allows students to build their technical and interpersonal skills. Each program incorporates industry, tertiary and research know-how and engages our partner school teachers in professional learning.

Directors
The following individuals have served as Director of Monash Tech School:

Partners
Monash Tech School is partnered with the following schools and training organisations:

School partners
 Ashwood High School
 Ashwood School
 Brentwood Secondary College
 Glen Waverley Secondary College
 Glenallen School
 Highvale Secondary College
 John Monash Science School
 Monash Children's Hospital School
 Monash Special Developmental School
 Mount Waverley Secondary College
 South Oakleigh Secondary College
 Wellington Secondary College
 Wheelers Hill Secondary College

Other partners
 Anatomics
 Appearition
 ARC Centre of Excellence in Future Low-Energy Electronics Technologies (FLEET)
 Australian Information Industry Association
 BioQuisitive
 CSIRO
 City of Monash
 Convergence Science Network
 Department of Jobs, Precincts and Regions
 Gateway LLEN 
 Holmesglen TAFE
 Howmet Aerospace
 Inspiring Australia
 Invinity Energy Systems
 Royal Society Of Victoria
 Yakult

References

External links
 Official website

Educational institutions established in 2017
Secondary schools in Melbourne
2017 establishments in Australia
Buildings and structures in the City of Monash